Salvador Guerra Rivera (born 10 October 2002) is a Spanish chess FIDE Master (2016).

Biography
In 2016, Salvador Guerra Rivera won the Spanish Youth Chess Championship in two age groups: U14 and U16. He has represented Spain at European Youth Chess Championships and World Youth Chess Championships, winning the European Youth Chess Championship in 2016 in Prague in the U14 age group. After this success, Salvador Guerra Rivera became FIDE master (FM).

In 2017, he won the Málaga City Chess Championship and the international chess tournament Open Casabermeja in Málaga.

References

External links

Salvador Guerra Rivera chess games at 365Chess.com

2002 births
Living people
People from Marbella
Sportspeople from the Province of Málaga
Spanish chess players
Chess FIDE Masters